William or Bill Francis may refer to:

 William Francis (chemist) (1817–1904), British chemist and publisher
 William B. Francis (1860–1954), U.S. Representative from Ohio
 William D. Francis (1889–1959),  Australian botanist
 William T. Francis (1869–1929), American lawyer, politician, and diplomat from Minnesota
 Wil Francis (born 1982), member of the American post-hardcore band Aiden
 Willie Francis (1929–1947), convicted murderer
 Sir William Francis (civil engineer) (born 1926), British engineer

Sports
 Willie Francis (swimmer) (1911–1997), Scottish backstroke swimmer
 William Francis (baseball) (1879–1942), Negro leagues baseball player
 William Francis (cricketer) (1856–1917), English cricketer
 Bill Francis (rugby union) (1894–1981), New Zealand rugby union footballer
 Bill Francis (rugby league) (born 1947), rugby league footballer who played in the 1960s and 1970s for Wigan, Wales, and Great Britain
 Bill Francis (broadcaster) (born 1947), New Zealand broadcaster, author and sports administrator
 Bill Francis (wrestler), son of Ed Francis

See also
William Frank (disambiguation)